The 2014–15 season of PBC CSKA Moscow was the 77th season of the club, and the CSKA's 7th season in the VTB United League. The team won the league once again, after also finishing first in the regular season. In the Euroleague, the team ended fourth.

Key dates
June 19, 2014: Hired head coach Dimitrios Itoudis.
July 9, 2014: Nando de Colo signs.
February 25, 2015: Andrei Kirilenko signs.

Roster

Transactions

In

|}

Out

|}

VTB United League

Standings

Playoffs

References

2014-15 
2014–15 Euroleague by club
2014–15 in Russian basketball